Deer Lake is a lake in central Burnaby, British Columbia, Canada. Deer Lake is home to a wide variety of flora and fauna and features a number of walking trails. These trails connect the lake and its surrounding forests and fields to a number of amenities, including a boat launch, picnic sites, a playground, washrooms, the Burnaby Art Gallery, Shadbolt Centre for the Arts, Burnaby Village Museum, and Century Gardens, as well as the surrounding community and long trails for walking.

Culture
The north side of Deer Lake Park, with Deer Lake at its centre, is home to several Arts and Culture destinations. The Burnaby Art Gallery, housed at Ceperley Mansion, provides access to historical and contemporary art, cares for and manages the City of Burnaby Permanent Art Collection. The Shadbolt Centre for the Arts is multi-purpose community arts facility provides public exhibitions, performances, festivals, and arts classes year-round. As well, concerts and festivals are held in the park immediately south of Shadbolt Centre. Burnaby Village Museum contains a combination of heritage and replica buildings depicting life in the region in the 1920s, and includes the vintage C. W. Parker Carousel.

Activities
Deer Lake Boat Rentals offers canoe, kayak, pedal boat, and rowboat rentals to the public during the summer months. Gas or electric motors are not allowed on this lake.

History

Deer Lake and the surrounding park is a highly altered habitat. The vegetation natural to the area is temperate rainforest dominated by conifers such as Tsuga heterophylla, Pseudotsuga menziesii, and Thuja plicata.  Most of this forest, whose trees were considered particularly tall for the Lower Mainland, was logged in the first few years of the 20th century. While rainbow trout, sculpin, and crayfish were likely native to Deer Lake, most of the aquatic animals are introduced species. These invasive species include bullfrog, ictalurid catfish and carp. 

The Legend of Deer Lake, as told by E. Pauline Johnson, is a Coast Salish tale about a hidden waterway between False Creek and Deer Lake. It was discovered by a young Indian, the first chief Capilano, who speared a "king" harbour seal in False Creek with his elk antler spear with western red cedar line.  The seal escaped through a hidden underground creek, and he spent months looking for it by the shore.  One day he was "beckoned" inland by what turned out to be the flames of a forest fire.  On the shore of Deer Lake he found the remains of the seal and recovered his spear, and with it, his prowess as a hunter.

Today there is a condominium development overlooking the lake where Oakalla Prison, a maximum security prison farm, once existed.

Deer Lake School (K-12) located nearby is named for the lake.

References

External links 

 City of Burnaby - Deer Lake Park:
 Phase II Development 

Lakes and waterways of Burnaby
Parks in Burnaby
Neighbourhoods in Burnaby
Lakes of the Lower Mainland
New Westminster Land District